The Primary Education Certificate (PEC) Examination is a national examination in Bangladesh administered by the Ministry of Primary and Mass Education, and taken by all students near the end of their fifth year in primary school. The PEC exam did not held for two years (2020 & 2022) due to the coronavirus pandemic. Later, the government announced that the test would be scrapped as a new curriculum was on the way. After 13 years, Government reintroduced scholarship exams for Class 5 students from 2022. At least 10 percent of fifth graders in every school across the country will be able to take part in the scholarship exams. Students who qualify for the talent-pool stipend get Tk 300 a month while general stipend holders get Tk 225 per month until they complete grade 8.

References

Education in Bangladesh
Primary school qualifications